Fabrizio Barbazza (born 2 April 1963) is an Italian former Formula One driver who raced for the AGS and Minardi teams and was the 1987 Indianapolis 500 Rookie of the Year.

Career

Early career
Barbazza was born in Monza, Lombardy.  After a career in motorcross in his teens, he began racing Formula Monza in 1982. The following year, he moved into Italian Formula Three Championship and, in 1984, finished sixth in the series. In 1985, he won four races and finished third in the championship. He then went to the United States and entered the American Racing Series, where he won four races and the title in his first attempt.

CART, F3000, and Formula One
After his success in ARS, Barbazza entered CART in 1987 and finished third in the 1987 Indianapolis 500, becoming CART's Rookie of the Year. Despite his success he could not find a ride in CART for 1988 and only made two starts in Formula 3000, along with failing to qualify three times. He returned to CART for 1989 for eight races with a best finish of eighth at Toronto. He also drove in eight Japanese Formula 3000 races.

In 1990 he joined International F3000 full-time driving for the Crypton team, finishing 16th in points with a best finish of fourth at his home track in Monza, his only point-scoring finish of the season. For 1991 Barbazza signed on with the struggling AGS Formula One team for the third round of the championship, replacing Stefan Johansson. Barbazza failed to qualify for all twelve races he attempted with the team and the team shut down after both Barbazza and his teammate Olivier Grouillard both failed to pre-qualify for the 1991 Spanish Grand Prix. For the 1992 racing season, Barbazza again returned to the Arciero team in CART. However, after respectable performances in two-year-old equipment for the first three races of the season, he wrecked his 1990-vintage Lola in practice for the 1992 Indianapolis 500 and was not able to qualify. It would be his last appearance in CART. In 1993 Barbazza rejoined Formula One with the Minardi team, scoring points twice in his first four races. However, Barbazza would be replaced by Pierluigi Martini after eight races. In 1995, while racing a Ferrari 333SP sports prototype at the Road Atlanta circuit, he was involved in a major accident with Jeremy Dale, which resulted in heavy head and chest injuries which left him in critical condition, in a coma and on artificial respiration. Although he fully recovered, he did not return to racing. Instead he started a go-kart circuit in Monza and began designing crash barriers.

He has since relocated to Cuba where he has set up a fishing resort in the north of the country called La Villa Clara. He has also raced again, at a local karting track in Cuba, where he has re-discovered his love for the sport.

Career summary

American open wheel racing

Indy Lights

(key)

CART

Indy 500 results

Complete International Formula 3000 results
(key) (Races in bold indicate pole position) (Races 
in italics indicate fastest lap)

Complete Japanese Formula 3000 results
(key) (Races in bold indicate pole position; races in italics indicate fastest lap)

Complete Formula One results
(key)

External links
Profile on F1 Rejects (archive)
Champcar Stats
Indylights Stats
Driver Database Profile
Racing Reference Profile

1963 births
Living people
Italian racing drivers
Italian Formula One drivers
AGS Formula One drivers
Indianapolis 500 Rookies of the Year
Indianapolis 500 drivers
Champ Car drivers
Indy Lights champions
Indy Lights drivers
Japanese Formula 3000 Championship drivers
Minardi Formula One drivers
International Formula 3000 drivers
EuroInternational drivers